Thalattosuchus is an extinct genus of marine crocodyliform that lived in the oceans during the Middle to Late Jurassic. Thalattosuchus was named in 2020. Thalattosuchus was a carnivore that spent much, if not all, its life out at sea. No Thalattosuchus eggs or nests have been discovered, so little is known of the reptile's life cycle, unlike other large marine reptiles of the Mesozoic, such as plesiosaurs or ichthyosaurs which are known to have given birth to live young out at sea. Where Thalattosuchus mated, whether on land or at sea, is currently unknown. The name Thalattosuchus means "sea crocodile".

Discovery and species
 
Fossil specimens referrable to Thalattosuchus are known from Middle-Late Jurassic deposits of England, France and Germany.

The type species of Thalattosuchus was initially described as Crocodilus superciliosus in 1852. During the 1860s the species superciliosus was moved to the genera Teleosaurus and Metriorhynchus. The type specimen of superciliosus was largely neglected in the literature, and was figured in 2018 and figured again in 2020 when the genus Thalattosuchus was created for the species.

Only one species is recognised, the type species T. superciliosus.

Description

Averaging  in length and weighing , Thalattosuchus was similar size to modern crocodiles. However, it had a streamlined body and a finned tail, making it a more efficient swimmer than modern crocodylian species.

Palaeobiology

Salt glands
Thalattosuchus had nasal salt glands which, like the salt glands of all other marine reptiles, were used to remove excess salt. This means that like Cricosaurus it would have been able to "drink" salt-water and eat equally salty prey, such as cephalopods, without dehydrating.

See also

List of marine reptiles

References

Late Jurassic crocodylomorphs of Europe
Prehistoric pseudosuchian genera
Prehistoric marine crocodylomorphs
Late Jurassic genus extinctions
Thalattosuchians
Fossil taxa described in 2020